Ricardo Reyes (September 13, 1956 – April 17, 2015), professionally known as Richie D'Horsie, was a Filipino actor and comedian.

Early life
Reyes was born in Manila, Philippines on September 13, 1956.

Career
Reyes rose to fame as a sidekick to Tito, Vic and Joey. He made his television debut on Discorama. The comedian also became part of Iskul Bukol in 1978 and joined Eat Bulaga! in 1979. He was also in T.O.D.A.S.: Television's Outrageously Delightful All-Star Show from 1981 to 1986.

Pepsi Paloma gang rape case

15-year old actress Pepsi Paloma accused Reyes and fellow comedians Vic Sotto and Joey de Leon of gang raping and taking photos of her on June 21, 1982 in a room at the Sulo Hotel in Quezon City. On July 31, Paloma's manager Rey dela Cruz lodged a formal complaint with Defense Minister Juan Ponce Enrile. On August 18, 1982, Paloma filed charges of rape and acts of lasciviousness against the three television personalities before the Quezon City fiscal's office. The crime of rape at the time, carried the death penalty in the Philippines, and to prevent his brother and his cohorts from being sent to the electric chair, Tito Sotto quickly went to see Paloma while she was still securing the services of Atty. Rene Cayetano. According to Paloma, Tito Sotto coerced her into signing an "Affidavit of Desistance" to drop the rape charges against his brother and cohorts—Tito Sotto had allegedly placed a pistol on the table in front of Paloma when he went to talk to her.

In exchange for the dismissal of the charges of rape, Vic Sotto, de Leon and D'Horsie issued a public apology towards Paloma stating:

Three years later, Paloma was found dead in an apparent suicide. Dela Cruz was murdered years later.

Personal life and death
In September 2000, Reyes was arrested in Muntinlupa after local police authorities caught him handing over methamphetamine (locally known as "shabu") to a 20-year-old.

Reyes died at the age of 58 on April 17, 2015, due to complications brought about by diabetes, kidney failure and brain stroke, reports said. His wake was at Loyola Memorial Park, Marikina.

Filmography

Film

Television

References

External links

1957 births
2015 deaths
People from Las Piñas
People from Manila
Filipino male comedians
Deaths from diabetes
Deaths from kidney disease
Burials at the Loyola Memorial Park
Filipino male film actors
GMA Network personalities